The 2021 Italian Basketball Cup, known as the Frecciarossa Final Eight 2021 for sponsorship reasons, was the 53rd edition of Italy's national cup tournament. The competition is managed by the Lega Basket for LBA clubs. The tournament was played from 11 to 14 February 2021 in Assago (Milan), at the end of the first half of the 2020–21 LBA season.

Umana Reyer Venezia were the defending champions.

All times are in Central European Time (UTC+01:00)''.

Qualification 
Qualified for the tournament are selected based on their position on the league table at the end of the first half of the 2020–21 LBA regular season.

Bracket

Quarterfinals

AX Armani Exchange Milano vs. UNAHOTELS Reggio Emilia

Segafredo Virtus Bologna vs. Umana Reyer Venezia

Happy Casa Brindisi vs. Allianz Pallacanestro Trieste

Banco di Sardegna Sassari vs. Carpegna Prosciutto Pesaro

Semifinals

AX Armani Exchange Milano vs. Umana Reyer Venezia

Happy Casa Brindisi vs. Carpegna Prosciutto Pesaro

Final

AX Armani Exchange Milano vs. Umana Reyer Venezia

Awards 

Source

References

External links

2020–21 in Italian basketball
Italian Basketball Cup
Italian Basketball Cup